Marc-René de Voyer de Paulmy d'Argenson may refer to:

 Marc-René de Voyer de Paulmy d'Argenson (1623-1700), seigneur d'Argenson et de Vueil-le-Mesnil, comte de Rouffiac, a French knight, politician and diplomat
 Marc-René de Voyer de Paulmy d'Argenson (1652-1721), 1st marquis d'Argenson, a French politician
 Marc-René de Voyer de Paulmy d'Argenson (1722-1787), French ambassador, Minister of War and a noted bibliophile and collector of art
 Marc-René de Voyer de Paulmy d'Argenson (1771–1842), a member of the French Chamber of Deputies
 René Louis de Voyer de Paulmy d'Argenson, marquis d'Argenson (1694–1757),  a French statesman
 René de Voyer de Paulmy d'Argenson, comte d'Argenson (1596–1651), a French diplomat

See also
 Marc-Pierre de Voyer de Paulmy d'Argenson
 Pierre de Voyer d'Argenson, Vicomte de Mouzay
 :Category:Marquesses of Argenson